High Park—Swansea was a provincial riding (electoral district) in the west-end of the city of Toronto, Ontario, Canada. It was represented in the Legislative Assembly of Ontario from 1975 to 1999.
 
It was created during the 1975 riding redistribution, taking much of its territory from the defunct High Park riding. It was abolished in 1999, and redistributed into the current-day Parkdale–High Park, York South—Weston and Davenport ridings, that followed the same boundaries as the federal ones.

Members of Provincial Parliament

Electoral results

1975 boundaries

1987 boundaries

References

Notes

Citations

Former provincial electoral districts of Ontario
Provincial electoral districts of Toronto